Manabi Bandyopadhyay was born in Naihati, West Bengal to parents Chittaranjan Bandyopadhyay and Rima Bandyopadhyay  in an educated family as a man. She is the first PhD professor in India who accepts her identity as a transgender person. Bandyopadhyay served as an associate professor in Bengali at Vivekananda Satobarshiki Mahavidyalaya. After completing her PhD in 2006, she took charge as Principal of Krishnagar Women's College on 7 June 2015 after a decade of struggling against patriarchy and convoluted notions regarding the third gender. Unlike men who would have applied for the same post, and women, who would have been appointed earlier, she had to garner support by projecting her career spanning over 16 years as a teacher, made possible by the intervention of the Chief Minister of West Bengal, Ms. Mamata Banerjee. 

She is India's first openly transgender college principal, and began work as such in 2015 at the Krishnagar Women's College in Nadia district. 

Manabi is a devotee of Sarada Devi and she was introduced to spiritual life by Swami Atmasthananda. She wrote several books in the Bengali literature. Her biography A Gift of Goddess Lakshmi speaks of her journey from her childhood to her becoming India's first Third Gender Principal and it was co-authored by Jhimli Mukherjee Pandey. She runs India's first transgender Magazine, Abomanob which is now an annual magazine which runs for more than 20 years. In 2019 Bandyopadhyay played a role in her debut film Purba Paschim Dakshin directed by Rajorshi Dey.

References

Living people
Transgender women
Indian transgender people
Year of birth missing (living people)
Bigg Boss Bangla contestants
Transgender academics